Hope Recordings is a Bristol, UK based record label, established in 1998 by Leon Alexander and Steve Satterthwaite.

The label is run by Leon Alexander, with English house music DJ and producer Nick Warren in control of its A&R. It is home to progressive house and breaks artists such as Starecase, Jaytech, Matt Rowan, and Parallel Sound. Well-known electronic music artists such as Max Graham, Timo Maas, James Holden, Hybrid, Starecase and Way Out West (Nick Warren is part of this progressive house duo) have worked with Hope Recordings in the past. Warren is head of Hope's A&R. The label regularly holds dance music events around the world - in the UK, Miami and Ibiza.

Hope Recordings reached their one hundredth release in 2011, which came in the form of a rare single from Nick Warren, entitled "Buenos Aires".

See also
 List of record labels

References

External links
 Official website
 Website featuring information on Hope management

British record labels
Record labels established in 1998
Companies based in Bristol
Music in Bristol
House music record labels